Flag of Ossetia may refer to

Flag of the Republic of North Ossetia–Alania, a federal subject of Russia
Flag of South Ossetia, a breakaway state internationally recognized as part of Georgia